Ákos Lajos Zuigéber (born 8 November 2002) is a Hungarian professional footballer who plays as a right winger for Nemzeti Bajnokság II club MTK Budapest.

Club career
Zuigéber made his professional debut with MTK Budapest on the 4 August 2019 against Aqvital FC. He already made an impact on his second game, scoring two goals against Dorogi FC on the 11 August 2019. Zuigéber also played in the UEFA Youth League with the club U19.

On 28 July 2020, Zuigéber joined Dorogi FC on loan from MTK for the 2020–21 season.

On 6 July 2021, Zuigéber joined Budafok on a new season-long loan.

International career
Zuigéber is a U17 international with Hungary, having allowed his team to qualify for both European championship and U17 World cup.

Career statistics

References

2002 births
Footballers from Budapest
Living people
Hungarian footballers
Hungary youth international footballers
Association football wingers
MTK Budapest FC players
Dorogi FC footballers
Budafoki LC footballers
Nemzeti Bajnokság II players